The Deposition is a 1602 painting of the Deposition of Christ by Peter Paul Rubens, previously attributed to Van Dyck. It is not to be confused with Rubens' much larger and more famous Descent from the Cross in Antwerp Cathedral.  The work is an oil painting on canvas and is now in the Galleria Borghese.

External links

 Galleria Borghese: The Deposition by Peter Paul Rubens

Paintings by Peter Paul Rubens
1602 paintings
Paintings in the Borghese Collection
Rubens
Paintings of the Virgin Mary